In organic chemistry, the sulfonamide functional group (also spelled sulphonamide) is an organosulfur group with the structure . It consists of a sulfonyl group connected to an amine group. Relatively speaking this group is unreactive.  Because of the rigidity of the functional group, sulfonamides are typically crystalline; for this reason, the formation of a sulfonamide is a classic method to convert an amine into a crystalline derivative which can be identified by its melting point.  Many important drugs contain the sulfonamide group.

A sulfonamide (compound) is a chemical compound that contains this group. Any sulfonamide can be considered as derived from a sulfonic acid by replacing a hydroxyl group with an amine group. 

In medicine, the term "sulfonamide" is sometimes used as a synonym for sulfa drug, a derivative or variation of sulfanilamide. The first sulfonamide was discovered in Germany in 1932.

Synthesis
Sulfonamides can be prepared in the laboratory in many ways. The classic approach entails the reaction of sulfonyl chlorides with an amine.  
R^1SO2Cl + R^2R^3NH -> R^1SO2NR^2R^3 + HCl
A base such as pyridine is typically added to absorb the HCl that is generated. Illustrative is the synthesis of sulfonylmethylamide. A readily available sulfonyl chloride source is tosyl chloride. The reaction of primary and secondary amines with benzenesulfonyl chloride is the basis of the Hinsberg reaction, a method for detecting primary and secondary amines.

Sultams

Sultams are cyclic sulfonamides. Bioactive sultams include the antiinflammatory ampiroxicam and the anticonvulsant sulthiame. Sultams are prepared analogously to other sulfonamides, allowing for the fact that sulfonic acids are deprotonated by amines. They are often prepared by one-pot oxidation of disulfides or thiols linked to amines. An alternative synthesis of sultams involves initial preparation of a linear sulfonamide, followed by intramolecular C-C bond formation (i.e. cyclization), a strategy that was used in the synthesis of a sultam-based deep-blue emitter for organic electronics.

Sulfinamides
The related sulfinamides (R(S=O)NHR) are amides of sulfinic acids (R(S=O)OH) (see sulfinyl). Chiral sulfinamides such as tert-butanesulfinamide, p-toluenesulfinamide and 2,4,6-trimethylbenzenesulfinamide are relevant to asymmetric synthesis.

Disulfonimides
Bis(trifluoromethanesulfonyl)aniline is a source of the triflyl group.

The disulfonimides are of the type  with two sulfonyl groups flanking an amine. As with sulfinamides, this class of compounds is used as catalysts in enantioselective synthesis.

See also
 Sulfonamide (medicine)
 Sulfamic acid
 Sulfamide

References

Functional groups